Boch बोच (formerly Village Development Committee), Nepal is a Ward of Bhimeshwor Municipality in Dolakha District in the Janakpur Zone of north-eastern Nepal. At the time of the 1991 Nepal census it had a population of 2,945 people living in 638 individual households.

References

External links
UN map of the municipalities of Dolakha District

Populated places in Dolakha District